The Washington oil field is an oil field and in Washington County, Pennsylvania.  It also produced natural gas.

The oil field fueled a boom in Washington County, Pennsylvania from the 1880s to the early 1900s.  For a time, the McGugin Gas Well was the largest flow of natural gas in the world and provided Pittsburgh with most of its natural gas needs.

Geological components 
The Gantz Sand, named after Washington's Gantz Oil Well, is located in the upper Devonian/lower Mississippian strata. The Gantz sand is frequently misidentified.

Early extraction efforts 
The Washington oil field was first tapped by Washington County Eureka Oil Company in 1861. Other short-lived exploratory efforts were subsequently undertaken at Prosperity, Lone Pine, and South Strabane Township.

Natural gas extraction  

In 1880, the Morgan Oil Company drilled a well at Alexander V. McGugin's farm in South Strabane Township. It was the largest flow of natural gas in the world. The rush of uncaptured gas could be heard for miles. Historian Earle Forrest described the event, saying that "one of nature's marvels had been uncorked".

A year of wasted gas flow passed before the flow was tapped into a  pipe to Pittsburgh. By 1885, 5 wells in the Canonsburg area had been drilled, growing to 17 by November 1, 1886. The success of this well initiated the beginning and development of the great oil and gas fields in southwestern Pennsylvania.

In 1967, the Pennsylvania Historical & Museum Commission erected a historical marker in honor of McGugin Gas Well well along Pennsylvania Route 18 northwest of Washington. The marker has since gone missing.

Oil extraction 

The well hit a sand formation, now known as the Gantz Sand, that produced oil, surprising the company. That sand formation is known as the Gantz Sand. This was the first oil well in Washington County and set off an oil boom in the area.

Within 3 months, 21 wells were drilled throughout the county. Production levels exploded in 1886; May production levels were from 4,000 barrels per day, rising to 10,120 barrels per day in June, and peaking at 17,549 barrels per day in October. Contemporary reports indicate that over 100 derricks were visible from the LeMoyne well on Prospect Avenue. The boom was especially notable in Murdocksville, Burgettstown, Cross Creek, and Cherry Valley. This increase in oil production signaled a shift in the center of the Pennsylvania oil industry from Northwestern Pennsylvania (home to the Drake Well) to Southwestern Pennsylvania, particularly Washington County.

Washington & Jefferson College also owned oil wells; in 1885 the college purchased the old Washington Fairgrounds and transformed it into a college athletic facility (eventually Cameron Stadium) by erecting oil wells on the grounds.

The boom and subsequent development lasted around 20 years, dropping significantly around shortly after the turn of the century. The last oil was shipped around 1916.

In 1953, the Pennsylvania Historical & Museum Commission erected a historical markers in honor of the well along West Chestnut Street in Washington.  The West Virginia Division of Culture and History erected a historical marker noting the Gantz Sand in Aurora, West Virginia.

Natural gas development in Marcellus Shale 

In the mid 2000s, Washington County would become central to the rebirth of the resource extraction industry, with the development of the hydraulic fracturing in the Marcellus Shale.

Gallery

Notes

References

Washington, Pennsylvania

Economic history of Pennsylvania
Oil wells
Oil fields of the United States
Natural gas fields in the United States
Geography of Washington County, Pennsylvania